Pancit choca is a Filipino black seafood noodle dish made with squid ink and bihon (rice vermicelli). It originates from Cavite, Philippines, and is originally known as pancit choca en su tinta in Caviteño Chavacano. It is also known more commonly as pancit pusit in Filipino. It is a type of pancit.

Names
In original Caviteño Chavacano, the dish is known as pancit choca (or choco) en su tinta, literally "noodle with squid in its own ink", commonly shortened to pancit choca or pancit choco. Choca or choco (sometimes spelled choka or choko) means "squid" in Chavacano.

Pancit choca is also known as pancit pusit ("squid pancit"); as well as pancit itim,  pancit negra, pancit estacion negra, pancit bihon à la negra, fideos negros, and "black pancit" among other names, due to its color.

Description
Pancit choca is initially cooked similarly to adobong pusit. First, the ink sacs (lumot) have to be removed from the squid without puncturing them. These are reserved for later. The squid is cleaned and diced into rings and sautéed along with garlic, onion, bay leaves, and (optionally) labuyo chili. Vinegar, soy sauce, a little bit of water, and the squid ink are then added and brought to a boil. Additional spices may be added to taste, like patis (fish sauce) and salt. The bihon (rice vermicelli) is added last with the heat reduced until it is soft but still al dente. Some versions soften the bihon in hot water and mix it at the very end of cooking.

It is traditionally garnished with crushed chicharon, scallions, kinchay (Chinese celery), and thinly-sliced kamias (bilimbi). It is served with calamansi and labuyo chili (if the latter wasn't added beforehand). Dayap (key lime) or biasong (a type of papeda), may also be used in place of calamansi.

Some variants of the dish use sotanghon (glass noodles) instead of bihon. Others also add mussels or shrimp, and/or cook the dish in shrimp stock instead of water.

See also

 Pancit estacion
 Pancit Molo
 Pancit palabok
 Calamares
 Fideuà
 List of seafood dishes

References

External links

choca
Squid dishes
Cavite cuisine